KRDR may refer to:

 KRDR (FM), a radio station (105.7 FM) licensed to serve Alva, Oklahoma, United States
 KCEI, a radio station (90.1 FM) licensed to serve Red River, New Mexico, United States, which held the call sign KRDR from 1997 to 2012
 Grand Forks Air Force Base (ICAO code KRDR)